Jean-Baptiste Alfred Perot (3 November 1863 – 28 November 1925) was a French physicist.

Together with his colleague Charles Fabry he developed the Fabry–Pérot interferometer in 1899.

The French Academy of Sciences awarded him the Janssen Medal for 1912. The Royal Society awarded Fabry and Perot the Rumford medal in 1918.

Spelling
There is some confusion about the spelling of Perot's last name. Perot himself used the spelling Pérot in scientific publications, but according to the French civil registry, his family name was Perot, without accent.

References

External links

 
 "Alfred Perot, un expérimentateur et inventeur de talent" A good biography, in French.

1863 births
1925 deaths
French physicists
Optical physicists